The second Miss Chinese International Pageant, Miss Chinese International Pageant 1989 was held on December 17, 1989 in Hong Kong. Miss Chinese International 1988 Michelle Monique Reis of Hong Kong crowned Kit Wong of Sydney, Australia as the new winner. Sydney would not go on to win the crown, until 2007, when Sarah Song captured the title.

Pageant information
The theme to this year's pageant is "The Traditions of the Dragon, The Embodiment of Beauty" 「龍的傳統  俏的化身」.  The Masters of Ceremonies were Carina Lau, Philip Chan, and Miss Hong Kong 1988 first runner-up Elizabeth Lee.

Results

Special awards
Miss Oriental Charm: Kit Wong 黄美潔 (Sydney)
Brightest Smile Award: Kit Wong 黄美潔 (Sydney)

Contestant list

Crossovers
Contestants who previously competed or will be competing at other international beauty pageants:

Miss World
 1989:  Macau  : Guilhermina Pedruco

Miss Universe
 1990: : Monica CHAN

External links
Johnny's Pageant Page - Miss Chinese International Pageant 1989

TVB
1989 beauty pageants
1989 in Hong Kong
Beauty pageants in Hong Kong
Miss Chinese International Pageants